Mirco Gerson (born 29 December 1992) is a Swiss beach volleyball player. He competed in the 2020 Summer Olympics.

References

External links
 
 
 
 

1992 births
Living people
Swiss beach volleyball players
Olympic beach volleyball players of Switzerland
Beach volleyball players at the 2020 Summer Olympics
Sportspeople from the canton of Bern